Saint-Majorique-de-Grantham is a parish municipality in the Centre-du-Québec region of Quebec. The population as of the Canada 2016 Census was 1,388.

Demographics 

Population trend:

Mother tongue language (2016)

See also
List of parish municipalities in Quebec
Official municipal website

References 

Parish municipalities in Quebec
Incorporated places in Centre-du-Québec